Victoria Bridge in Bath, England, was built in 1836 across the River Avon. The bridge has been recognised as a Grade II* listed building.

Victoria Bridge is an important example of a suspension bridge which initially carried horses and carts but later carried cyclists and pedestrians.

Construction

Victoria Bridge is a Dredge taper bridge, a type which modern viewers often see as a hybrid between a suspension bridge and a cable-stayed bridge, built by Motley and Dredge. The road deck is joined to the chains by iron eyebars, which, unusually, are not vertical. James Dredge who was a brewer in Bath designed the bridge to carry beer from his brewery across the river without using a ferry or having to detour through the city centre. Construction cost £1,760. He patented the 'taper principle' based on using chains rather than cables, as is now more common in suspension bridges. Dredge's bridge design was considered "a very significant yet relatively short-lived phase in suspension bridge development".

The deck is made of wooden planks.

Initially the bridge was used for horse-drawn carts but later only carried bicycles and pedestrians.

Closure and restoration

In October 2010  the bridge was closed to users,  because of concerns about the safety of the beams and cables. This caused criticism from cycling groups in the city. It was reopened later in October 2010, but then closed again.

Further inspections were carried out by a structural engineer in September 2011.
In November 2011 the tow-path was closed and then the navigation itself was closed to all boats.
The bridge was listed on the Heritage at Risk Register.

Restoration costs were estimated at £3 million in 2011. Emergency work to prop up either side of the bridge and apply temporary strapping took place in November 2011.  Full restoration work was originally planned to be completed by the winter of 2013.

Work on restoring the bridge started in 2014, and an internal structure was fitted to render both the bridge and the canal usable during restorations. The bridge was taken apart and rebuilt with additional steel reinforcing, and repainted dark green. It officially reopened on 15 January 2015.

References

Bridges in Somerset
Road bridges in England
Grade II* listed buildings in Bath, Somerset
Grade II* listed bridges in England
Cable-stayed bridges in England
Structures on the Heritage at Risk register in Somerset
Bridges across the River Avon, Bristol
Bridges by James Dredge
1836 establishments in England